Mcast may refer to:

 MCAST, Malta College of Arts, Science and Technology
 multicast — simultaneous delivery of information to a group of destinations